Dr. Mark Terry is a Canadian scholar, explorer, and filmmaker. He is a Fellow of the Royal Society of Canada and teaches at the Faculty of Environmental and Urban Change, York University and the Faculty of Arts, Wilfrid Laurier University.

Education
He received his PhD from York University in Toronto defending his dissertation titled The Geo-Doc: Remediating the Documentary Film as an Instrument of Social Change on January 18, 2019. He received his master's degree from York University in 2015 with a thesis titled The Documentary Film as an Instrument of Social Change. In 1980, he received his Bachelor of Arts degree from Glendon College, York University in English and Media Studies. In 2021, he was named a Fellow of the Royal Society of Canada, the country's highest academy.

Career
In 2009, Terry produced and directed the documentary feature film The Antarctica Challenge: A Global Warning (2009) and was invited to screen it at COP15, the United Nations Framework Convention on Climate Change held in Copenhagen that year. The film was screened 25 times at the two-week conference and viewed online 60,000 times by delegates. The screenings established a relationship with Terry and the Communications Department of the United Nations Framework Convention on Climate Change that continues to this day. He was asked to produce a second film on Arctic research for the subsequent climate summit, COP16 in Cancun. The film he directed, The Polar Explorer (2010), consists of Terry profiling the research team from ArcticNet during a crossing of the Northwest Passage, and this made The Polar Explorer the first film to document a complete crossing. The film was once again screened 25 times at the conference and was included in a policy-writing session as a resource. The resulting resolution –  Enhanced Action on Adaptation: Section II, Subsection 25 of the Cancun Accord –  was co-authored by Terry.

While the medium of the documentary film was welcomed as a communications tool by the UN, a demand for more visible evidence of climate change was made. To accommodate this, Terry conceived of the Geo-Doc to provide multiple documentary shorts of climate research from around the world on one digital map. The project was an extension of the Youth Climate Report, a curation project commissioned by the UNFCCC in 2011. The project called for the global community of youth to produce short video films of climate research in their home countries. From 2011 to 2015, the best films were edited together to create a feature-length documentary film that was screened for delegates attending the annual UN climate summits. In 2015, the Geo-Doc format was introduced at the Paris climate summit. It was adopted by the UNFCCC the following year as a partner program to showcase the best videos submitted to the Global Youth Video Competition. The Youth Climate Report GIS Project continues to this day. In 2021, the United Nations recognized this innovative form of documentary film with a Sustainable Development Goals Action Award  and Terry was inducted into the Order of Vaughan.

Filmography

Terry has contributed to 66 film and television productions as a producer, director, writer, publicist, actor, and even stunt driver. As an actor, he is perhaps best known as the Alien Pilot in Gene Roddenberry's Earth: Final Conflict (1997–2002) produced by Atlantis Alliance Communications and distributed by Universal Pictures Home Entertainment. He is best known as a documentary filmmaker, specializing in environmental themes. In particular, many of his films made for PBS in the US and CBC in Canada focus on climate change research in the polar regions: The Antarctica Challenge: A Global Warning (2009), The Polar Explorer (2010), Polar (2011), A Climate of Change (2014), Antarctica in Decline (2017), and The Changing Face of Iceland (2021). His latest documentary on climate change impacts in Iceland premiered at the UN climate summit, COP26, in Glasgow, Scotland, on November 4, 2021.

In 2011, Terry was honored by the Academy of Canadian Cinema & Television with its Gemini Humanitarian Award for his dedicated lifetime service to environmental filmmaking.

He has won 39 international awards for his film work, including back-to-back Audience Choice Awards at the American Conservation Film Festival for The Antarctica Challenge: A Global Warning in 2010 and The Polar Explorer in 2011.

Explorer

As an explorer, Terry was made a Fellow of The Explorers Club in 2010 and a Fellow of the Royal Canadian Geographical Society in 2012. He has sailed all three of the major passages that connect the Atlantic and Pacific Oceans: the Drake Passage, the Panama Canal and the Northwest Passage. He was commissioned by the Explorers Museum in Ireland to lead a pennant expedition through the Mindo Cloudforest of the Andes Mountains in Ecuador in 2016.

In 2010, the Canadian Chapter of The Explorers Club awarded Terry its highest honor, the Stefansson Medal, for his "unique contributions to documenting the natural world". In 2013, the Governor-General of Canada decorated Terry with Queen Elizabeth II Diamond Jubilee Medal for his "international humanitarian service" informing the environmental policymakers of the United Nations through his documentary film projects. In 2015, Canadian Geographic Magazine named Terry one of Canada's "Top 100 Greatest Explorers".

Research Work
Mark Terry's recent research has been published by Palgrave Macmillan in the book The Geo-Doc: Geomedia, Documentary Film, and Social Change (2020). He is currently the Chair of the ADERSIM Arctic Group, the Advanced Disaster, Emergency, and Rapid Response Simulation program at York University in Toronto, Canada. He is also an Associate of the UNESCO Chair in Reorienting Education through Sustainability. He continues his research in digital media and humanitarian communications as a research fellow at the Dahdaleh Institute of Global Health Research and the Faculty of Environmental and Urban Change at York University in Toronto. He also serves as contract faculty of environmental studies teaching the courses EU/ENVS 1010: Introduction to Environmental Documentaries and EU/ENVS 5073: Social Movements, Activism and Social Change: Underrepresented Voices in Climate Change.

In 2020, York University gave Dr. Terry the President's Award for Research  and in 2016, honoured Dr. Terry's innovative work with the Geo-Doc with the President's Sustainability Leadership Award. Terry has given more than 80 lectures at universities and academic conferences throughout the world presenting research papers on the subjects of documentary film theory, digital media, and climate change research in the polar regions. He has also given three TED Talks on the subjects of Antarctica, the Arctic, and published a book of poems in 2020 entitled "Pandemic Poetry".

Funded Research Projects 

 The Social Sciences and Humanities Research Council of Canada Insight Development Grant ($74,966): Disability Rights in Ghana: Capturing Lived Experiences through Grassroots Videography, 2021
 Hunter Family Foundation ($150,000): Planetary Health Film Lab, 2021
 The Social Sciences and Humanities Research Council of Canada General Research Fund ($10,000): The Changing Face of Iceland, 2021
 Wilfrid Laurier University ($5,000): Student Life Levy Activist Filmmaking Workshop, 2020–2021
 Academic Innovation Fund ($5,000): New Media Approaches for Environmental Studies, 2020
 The Social Sciences and Humanities Research Council of Canada Connections Grant ($25,000): Planetary Health Film Lab, 2020
 The Social Sciences and Humanities Research Council of Canada Exchange Grant ($2,400): Youth Climate Report, 2019–2020

Published Work 

 Speaking Youth to Power: Influencing Climate Policy at the United Nations (Book: Author; Palgrave Macmillan, 2023)
The Emerging Role of Geomedia in the Environmental Humanities (Book: co-editor; Rowman & Littlefield, 2022)
The United Nations Global Youth Statement (Policy: co-editor)
Communicating in the Anthropocene: Intimate Relations (Book: chapter author, 2021)
 Pandemic Poetry (Book: author, 2020)
 The Geo-Doc: Geomedia, Documentary Film, and Social Change (Book: author, 2020)
 "Retraining Our Perception: Semiotic Storytelling in Ecocinematic Documentaries," Networks of Experience: Art and (Dis)Embodiment (Book: chapter author, 2019)
 Portraits of Canadian Women Who Inspire (Book: editor, 2013)
 "May Watkis" in Jane Gaines, Radha Vatsal, and Monica Dall’Asta, eds. Women Film Pioneers Project (Encyclopedia: author, 2020)
 "Amplifying the Voice of Youth through Planetary Health Films," The Lancet (Journal: author, 2020)
 "Explorations in Digital Media," The Explorers Log (Journal: author, 2020)
 "Enhancing Environmental Education through Geomedia," Association for the Study of Literature and Environment (Journal: author, 2020)
 "Aquarela: The Real Shape of Water," Water Canada Magazine *(Magazine: author, 2019)
 "New Media, New Documentary," Reviews in Cultural Theory, Issue 8.1 (Journal: author, 2018)
 "Mindo Cloudforest Expedition Field Report," The Explorers Museum (Field Report: co-author, 2016) 
 "The Antarctica Challenge," Ripcord Adventure Journal, v. 1, no. 3 (Journal: author, 2017)
 "Screening Truth to Power: A Reader on Documentary Activism," Art Threat (Journal: author, 2015)
 "Map Room," World Policy Journal, v. 30, no. 1 (Journal: co-author, 2013)
 "Arctic Tundra to Shrink by 51 Percent," Canadian Geographic Magazine (Ottawa: June 14, 2010, Magazine: author)
 "Earth's Environment Changing Rapidly, Concludes Oslo Science Conference," Canadian Geographic Magazine (Ottawa, June 16, 2010, Magazine: author)
 "Threat of Melting Ice Highlighted on First Day of Polar Conference," Canadian Geographic Magazine (Ottawa, June 9, 2010, Magazine: author)
 "Crossing the Northwest Passage," Canadian Geographic Magazine (Ottawa, October 8 to 25, 2010, Magazine: author)

References

External links 

 
 
Mark Terry personal website
Mark Terry academic website

Living people
Canadian documentary film directors
Canadian explorers
Royal Canadian Geographical Society fellows
York University alumni
Academic staff of York University
Year of birth missing (living people)
Canadian documentary film producers